Henry M. Gunn Senior High School is one of two public high schools in Palo Alto, California, the other being Palo Alto High School.

In 1964, the Palo Alto Unified School District announced that it would name the district's third high school after him. The Class of 1966 was the first class to graduate from Gunn High School.

1,993 students attended the school in the 2019–2020 school year. In 1992, the school was honored as a California Distinguished School.

History 
The land under Gunn High School was purchased by the school district from Stanford University for $358,641, under the condition that it could not be sold to another entity. Gunn High School opened in August 1964 with an initial enrollment of 600 students, comprising 300 sophomores and 300 juniors. It was named after Henry Gunn, the superintendent of the Palo Alto Unified School District from 1950 to 1961. Students were drawn from Terman Middle School and from the other two PAUSD high schools then open—Palo Alto High and Cubberley High. The 974-seat auditorium was named in 1965 after Karl Spangenberg, a recently deceased school district trustee. The school held its first football game in 1965, with Cubberley High. The 1966 class was first to graduate.

Gunn High School received national attention in 2009 after four of its students committed suicide over a span of seven months, mainly by walking in front of trains at a nearby crossing. Over the period of 2006–2016, the school's suicide rate was four to five times higher than the national average. In 2017, a senior student committed suicide. In the past decade, attempts have been made to improve the emotional health of students attending the school.

Academics
Gunn offers 22 Advanced Placement (AP) classes and 8 Honors classes which are included in the weighted Grade Point Average (GPA).

In May 2010, 658 students took 1820 AP tests. 93% scored 3 or higher and 54% scored a grade of 5. Gunn no longer ranks students, but ranking was previously recorded by decile.

Hanna Rosin wrote in a 2015 The Atlantic article that due to the emphasis on academics and competition between students, Gunn became "an extreme distillation of what parents in the meritocratic elite expect from a school." Around that time, families clamored to buy houses in Gunn's attendance boundary so their children could attend the school. According to Rosin, after a spate of suicides of Gunn students in the 2010s, parents began to worry about whether the competitive atmosphere was harming students' mental well-being.

Mathematics
Gunn offers a wide selection of mathematics courses ranging from Algebra to AP Calculus BC. There are often three tracks of each subject offered: one at the college-prep level, another at the Advanced level, and one at the Honors level. Students who have completed the AP Calculus pathway before their senior year also have the opportunity to take Multivariable Calculus and Linear Algebra as a dual enrollment pathway in partnership with Foothill College. There are also two mathematics electives at Gunn: Applied Math H and AP Statistics, available to juniors and seniors. 

The math circle is one of the largest clubs on the Gunn High School campus, and its corresponding math team has participated in many competitions. Each year, the school boasts about 30 American Invitational Mathematics Examination qualifiers. After placing 15th nationally in 4 different tournaments during the 2020-21 school year, the 2021-22 math team has won HMMT November and placed 4th in the Berkeley Math Tournament.

PLTW
Gunn is a host to Project Lead the Way (PLTW), an organization which promotes STEM (science, technology, engineering, and math) education. Courses from this program include Digital Electronics and Introduction to Engineering Design, as well as Principles of Engineering.

Statistics

Demographics
2015–2016
 1,939 students: 1,006 Male (51.9%), 933 Female (48.1%)

, according to Hanna Rosin, 74% of Gunn's student body has one or more parents with a master's degree or higher, or other graduate-level degree.

Standardized testing

Student groups

Gunn offers over 90 student clubs, teams, and organizations which focus on art, community action, activism, culture, environment, politics, music, dance, journalism, and other avocations.

Theatre
Gunn students stage three major productions every year (Fall, Spring, and the student-directed "One Acts"), along with occasional staged readings. The Spring show alternates each year between a Shakespearean play and a musical.

Music
The music program consists of several music groups including Symphonic Band, Wind Ensemble, Jazz Big Band, Jazz Band II, Orchestra, Concert Band, Concert Choir, and Chamber Singers. Gunn also occasionally hosts California Music Educators Association Festivals at its Spangenberg Theater.

Debate
The debate team at Gunn High School consists of Policy, Parliamentary, and Public Forums, as well as a speech team.

For the 2017–2018 school year, the club did exceptionally well at the national and state level, with one team entering Tournament of Champions (TOC) octofinals.

Robotics team
The Gunn Robotics Team (GRT), established in 1997, competes at the FIRST Robotics Competition. It is also the only FIRST Robotics team to have won the national animation award more than once, in 1997, 2006, and 2012. They also won best models worldwide in their 2010 animation.

In 2012, the Robotics Team won the National FRC Championship Excellence in Design Award (3D Animation) sponsored by Autodesk. GRT is the only team that has won a total of three Animation awards in the history of FIRST.

Notable alumni

 Steve Almond, class of 1984 – writer (The Evil B.B. Chow, Candyfreak)
 Mehdi Ballouchy, class of 2002 – professional soccer player,  with the New York Red Bulls
 Raphael Bob-Waksberg, class of 2002 – comedian, writer, producer, and actor; creator of  BoJack Horseman
 Matt Flynn, class of 1988 – drummer (The B-52's, Maroon 5)
 Illi Gardner, class of 2017 – British professional racing cyclist
Lisa Hanawalt, production designer and producer on BoJack Horseman
 Chris Hart, class of 2002 – American-Born Black Japanese Pop Singer/Songwriter/Producer
 Andrew D. Huberman, Professor of Neurobiology and Ophthalmology at Stanford School of Medicine.
 Andrew Jacobson, class of 2003 – professional soccer player,  with FC Dallas
 Stephan Jenkins, class of 1983 – lead singer for Third Eye Blind
 Stanley Jordan, class of 1977 – jazz guitarist (Magic Touch)
 Ted Kaehler, class of 1968 – computer scientist (Xerox PARC, Apple Computer, Walt Disney Imagineering, others)
 Nina Katchadourian, class of 1985 – conceptual artist
 David Leavitt, class of 1979 – author (The Lost Language of Cranes, The Body of Jonah Boyd)
 Michael Lederer, class of 1974 – author
 Zoe Lofgren, class of 1966 – U.S. Representative for California's 16th congressional district, 1995 – present
 Matt Marquess, class of 2004 – professional soccer player for the Kansas City Wizards
 Brian Martin, class of 1992 – Olympic medal-winning luger
 Chanel Miller, class of 2010 – artist, public speaker, and author of Know My Name
 Shemar Moore, class of 1988 – actor (Criminal Minds, The Young and the Restless)
 Ann Packer, class of 1977 – author (The Dive from Clausen's Pier)
 George Packer, class of 1978 – journalist (Mother Jones, The New Yorker) and author
 Tom E. Politzer, class of 1976 – saxophonist (Tower of Power)
 Rick Porras, class of 1984 – film producer (co-producer of The Lord of the Rings trilogy and Contact)
 Joanne Reid, class of 2009 – Olympic biathlete
 Brett Simon, class of 1992 – film director (Assassination of a High School President)
 Akira Tana, class of 1970 – American jazz drummer
 Jacqueline Vayntrub, class of 2000 — professor of Biblical Studies at Yale University, Yale_Divinity_School#Current_faculty_(ca._2019)
 Anne Wojcicki, class of 1991 – biologist, founder of 23andMe and former wife of Google founder Sergey Brin
 Susan Wojcicki, class of 1986 – former CEO of YouTube.
 Yiaway Yeh, class of 1996 – Mayor of Palo Alto, 2012
 Jessica Yu, class of 1983 – Oscar-winning documentarian and film director (Breathing Lessons: The Life and Work of Mark O'Brien, Ping Pong Playa)

References

External links

 
 The Oracle, student-run newspaper

Palo Alto Unified School District
High schools in Santa Clara County, California
Public high schools in California
Buildings and structures in Palo Alto, California
Educational institutions established in 1964
1964 establishments in California